Genchi may refer to:
Genchi Genbutsu, the key principle of the Toyota Production System
Jean Genchi (born 1956), British rower